Johann Sperling (12 July 1603 – 12 August 1658) was a German physician, zoologist and physicist, deacon and Rektor of the University of Wittenberg. He was among the first to practise zoology as a natural science, writing a first handbook about animals, Zoologia physica.

Career 
Born in Zeuchfeld the son of the minister Paul Sperling and his wife Dorothea, he was educated from age 12 at Landesschule Schulpforta, graduating six years later. From 2 June 1621 he studied at the faculty of philosophy of the University of Wittenberg, reaching the degree of magister on 27 September 1625. From 2 October 1628, he had the right to lecture at universities.

Sperling was appointed professor of physics on 2 February 1634. He served as a deacon of the faculty of philosophy four times, and was twice Rektor of the university. When he died, he was buried in the Schlosskirche on 15 August 1658.

Sperling was among the first to use the term zoology and treat it as a natural science. His book deals first with general aspects common to animals, then with the different classes and species. He has been called an "early modern zoologist".

Selected works 

Among Sperling's scientific publications are:
 De morbis totius substantie, Wittenberg 1633
 De orIgine formarum, Wittenberg 1634
 Institutiones physicae, Wittenberg 1639 and more
 De formatione hominis in utero matris, 1641
 Meditationes in Jul. Cael. Scaligeri exercitationes de subtilitate, Wittenberg 1656
 De principiis nobiscum natis, Wittenberg 1657
 Carpologia physica, Wittenberg 1661
 Synopsis anthropologiae physicae, Wittenberg 1659
 Zoologia physica, Wittenberg 1661
 Synopsis physica, Wittenberg 1661
 Exercitationes physicae, Wittenberg 1663

Literature 
 Heinz Kathe: Die Wittenberger Philosophische Fakultät 1501–1817. Böhlau, Köln 2002, 
 Walter Friedensburg: Geschichte der Universität Wittenberg. Max Niemeyer, Halle (Saale) 1917
 Fritz Roth: Restlose Auswertungen von Leichenpredigten und Personalschriften für genealogische und kulturhistorische Zwecke. vol. 10, p. 134, R 9189
 Hans Theodor Koch: Die Wittenberger Medizinische Fakultät (1502–1652) – Ein biobibliographischer Überblick. In: Stefan Oehmig: Medizin und Sozialwesen in Mitteldeutschland zur Reformationszeit. Evangelische Verlagsanstalt, Leipzig 2007,

References

Bibliography

External links 

 

1603 births
1658 deaths
People from Freyburg, Germany
German zoologists
17th-century German scientists
17th-century zoologists
17th-century German physicians
University of Wittenberg alumni
Academic staff of the University of Wittenberg
17th-century German writers
17th-century German male writers